Okuno is a Japanese surname. Notable people with the surname include:

Chloe Okuno (born 1987), American film director
, Japanese tennis player
, Japanese synchronized swimmer
, Japanese sport wrestler
, Japanese volleyball player
, Japanese football player
, Japanese voice actress
, Japanese swimmer
, Japanese footballer
, Japanese footballer and manager
, Japanese footballer
, Japanese politician
, Japanese footballer

See also
Okuno Dam, a dam in Shizuoka Prefecture, Japan

Japanese-language surnames